This is a list of wars that involve Myanmar (Burma).

See also
 Combatants of the internal conflict in Myanmar

References

Myanmar
Myanmar history-related lists
 
Wars